The 2003 Texas Longhorns baseball team represented the University of Texas at Austin in the 2003 NCAA Division I baseball season. The Longhorns played their home games at Disch–Falk Field. The team was coached by Augie Garrido in his seventh season at Texas.

The Longhorns reached the College World Series, where they recorded a pair of wins against Miami (FL) and a pair of losses against eventual champion Rice.

Personnel

Roster

Coaches

Schedule and results

References

Texas Longhorns baseball seasons
Texas Longhorns
Texas
College World Series seasons
Texas Longhorns Baseball
Big 12 Conference baseball champion seasons